Park Jong-Jin (born 24 June 1987) is a South Korean football player who plays for Incheon United FC as a midfielder.

Career

Club career
He joined JEF United Chiba in 2007.

In 2009, he moved to K-League side Gangwon FC and made 23 appearances.

On 12 July 2010, he moved to Suwon Samsung Bluewings.

International career
He was a midfielder on the South Korea national U-20 team playing at the 2005 FIFA World Youth Championship. And he was playing at the 2007 FIFA U-20 World Cup.

Club statistics

References

External links

 
 FIFA Player Statistics

1987 births
Living people
Association football midfielders
South Korean footballers
South Korean expatriate footballers
JEF United Chiba players
Mito HollyHock players
Gangwon FC players
Suwon Samsung Bluewings players
Ansan Mugunghwa FC players
J1 League players
J2 League players
K League 1 players
K League 2 players
Expatriate footballers in Japan
South Korean expatriate sportspeople in Japan